Alice and The Lost Novel is a 1929 collection of two essays by American author Sherwood Anderson. The book was first published in a limited edition of 530 copies by London publisher Elkin Mathews and Marrot. It consists of two autobiographical pieces.

References

1929 American novels
Novels by Sherwood Anderson